Romano-Gothic refers to an architectural style, also called Early Gothic, which evolved in Europe in the 12th century from the Romanesque style, and was an early style in Gothic architecture. In England "Early English Gothic" remains the usual term. The style is characterized by rounded and pointed arches on a vertical plane. Flying buttresses were used, but are mainly undecorated. Romanesque buttresses were also used. Romano-Gothic began to use the decorative elements of Gothic architecture, but not the constructional principles of more fully Gothic buildings.  Especially in Germany, the term is used of relatively late buildings in a cautious provincial version of Gothic.

Combining ribbed vaults and the Romanesque tradition, the cathedrals of  Angers (1149–1159) and Poitiers (1162) are examples of a primitive Gothic art, more austere and less well lit.

See also
Gothic architecture
Romanesque architecture
Medieval architecture

External links
 Romanogothicism in the Netherlands